Robert Joseph David (January 15, 1921 – July 4, 1997) was an American football guard and fullback. He played college football for Villanova and Notre Dame and professional football for the Los Angeles Rams and Chicago Rockets.

Early years
David was born in 1921 in Blue Island, Illinois. He began his collegiate career at the University of Notre Dame as a football candidate. After his freshman year at Notre Dame, he was inducted into the United States Marine Corps during World War II and was transferred in 1943 to Villanova University as a trainee in the V-12 program.

He played college football at the fullback position for Villanovam. While playing for Villanova in 1944, and despite appearing in only five games before being transferred to Camp Lejeune for active military service, he was selected for the 1944 All-Catholic All-America team. He rejoined Villanova in the fall of 1946 after being discharged from the Marine Corps.

Professional football
David was selected by the Los Angeles Rams in the 27th round (253rd overall pick) of the 1947 NFL Draft. He appeared in eight games for the Rams in 1947 and three games in 1948. He finished the 1948 season with the Chicago Rockets of the All-America Football Conference. He appeared in four games for the Rockets.

Later years
David died in 1997 at age 76.

References

1921 births
1997 deaths
Los Angeles Rams players
Chicago Rockets players
Villanova Wildcats football players
Players of American football from Illinois
People from Blue Island, Illinois
United States Marine Corps personnel of World War II